Coquelles is a commune in the Pas-de-Calais department near Calais in northern France.

The town comprises a shopping centre, hotels and farm in Vieille Coquelles (old Coquelles), part of the L'Européenne autoroute (A16) and the Channel Tunnel terminal.

The Eurotunnel Calais Terminal is located in Coquelles off the A16, exit 42. This is the terminus of shuttle services from the UK, as well as the terminus of the LGV Nord, whereby Eurostar services can travel into the Channel Tunnel.

Population

See also
Communes of the Pas-de-Calais department
France–UK border

References

External links

 Coquelles on the Quid website 

Calais migrant crisis (1999–present)
Communes of Pas-de-Calais
Channel Tunnel
France–United Kingdom border crossings
Pas-de-Calais communes articles needing translation from French Wikipedia
Pale of Calais